Ivar Johansen (16 December 1910 – 23 April 1984)  was a Norwegian bobsledder who competed in the late 1940s. At the 1948 Winter Olympics in St. Moritz, he finished fifth in the four-man and seventh in the two-man events.

References
1948 bobsleigh two-man results
1948 bobsleigh four-man results
Bobsleigh two-man results: 1932-56 and since 1964 

Olympic bobsledders of Norway
Bobsledders at the 1948 Winter Olympics
Norwegian male bobsledders
1910 births
1984 deaths